Marlborough Station is a CTrain light rail station in Calgary, Alberta. It serves the Northeast Line (Route 202) and opened on April 27, 1985, as part of the original northeast line.

The station is located in the median of 36 Street NE, located near its intersection with 8 Avenue NE/Marlborough Drive NE. Pedestrian overpasses connect the station to both sides of 36 Street NE. Stairs, escalators, as well as an elevator provide access down to the center-loading platform.
485 spaces of the mall facility are now owned by Calgary Transit and are designated for park-and-ride service.

As part of Calgary Transit's plan to operate 4-car trains by the end of 2014, all 3-car platforms have been extended. Marlborough station saw new furnishings in addition to a platform extension. Construction started in the late Summer of 2013, and was finished in January 2014. 

In 2005, the station registered an average transit of 19,600 boardings per weekday, the busiest station in the system other than the downtown platforms.

Crime 
Marlborough Station has been criticized for being a crime hotspot in the Calgary C-Train System. On a CityNews interview in January 2022 with Calgary Transit Lead Staff 'Stephen Tauro', it was listed as one of the 5 stations with an unusually high crime rate. The others being: Rundle, Southland, Heritage and Sunalta Stations.

References

CTrain stations
Railway stations in Canada opened in 1985